The Maldives Industrial fisheries company, MIFCO, is a public company engaged in the production, processing and marketing of fish and fishery products. The company was incorporated in 1993.

History 
Fishing has always been a part of the Maldivian lifestyle. In addition to being a primary food source, it was also the primary source of income for island communities. The practices of small-scale fishing - feed the family, then the community, and export the excess - personifies the elements of sustainable fisheries in the Maldives.

In 1977, the Government of Maldives, with a Japanese investment set up a cannery at Lh.Felivaru, adding commercial value to the daily catch. This began the first industrial scale value addition process in the Maldives fishing industry. To this day, canned tuna is popularly known as Felivaru Masdhalhu.

MIFCO aims to continually develop the Maldivian fisheries industry, supplying sustainable and responsible fishery products. The traditional fishing method is environmentally friendly and is a prestigious heritage passed down through generations. We will strive to benchmark Maldivian fishery products in the global market as the leader in sustainable fisheries.

Pole and line fishery 
The Maldivian skipjack industry, a 100% pole and line process is the dominant economic fishery activity in the country.

Products

Canned tuna 
Mifco's canned tuna is specified as Premium, Fancy, Standard, and local packs that include sauce tuna, and caterers pack. Canned products are manufactured from cooked tuna fish, which is skinned, headed, eviscerated, trimmed of all blood meat, scorched and packed with a covering of oil or brine in hermetically sealed can and sterilized to achieve commercial sterility by application of heat.

Frozen tuna 
The fish is treated by Blast or brine freezing method.
The frozen species are Katsuwonus Pelamis “Skipjack” and Thunnus Albacares “Yellowfin” tuna.

Fish meal 
Fishmeal, a fertilizer as well as an essential ingredient in poultry, and fish feed, this is by product of the cannery. To reduce amount of waste exhausted from fish products, fish meal is produced from the waste fish from the cannery.

Katsuobushi 
Katsuobushi is the Japanese name for a specific type of smoked dried tuna. Although Katsuobushi is a form of dried skipjack, the product may be said to be similar to the traditional Maldive Fish. However, the process of smoke drying which lasts for 21 days at a minimum as opposed to less than a week's drying for normal smoked skipjack means that Katsuobushi is much drier, therefore a better preserved product. Quality of the product is maintained by using specially imported wood from Japan at specific stages of smoking and by using Refrigerated Containers for shipping the finished product.

Loins 
There are two kind of loins: cooked loins and frozen loins.

Frozen Yellow Fin Tuna 

Frozen/chilled yellow fin, gilled and gutted, are exported individually cleaned and packed in master card board boxes with gel ice packets.

See also 
 Industries in Maldives

External links 
 MIFCO Official site

Companies of the Maldives